Sandy is an unincorporated community in Blanco County, in the U.S. state of Texas. According to the Handbook of Texas, the community had a population of 25 in 2000.

History
The first settlers to the community came from the Deep South in the mid-19th century. The community's abundance of water and fertile soil attracted them there. A post office was established at Sandy in 1872. It also had frequent Indian raids. Three other communities named Hickory, Spring Creek, and White Oak developed around this area in the early 1880s. Its population changed irregularly after 1925 but never went above 30. The post office continued to serve 25 residents in the 1980s, most of whom were a part of the turkey industry. The population remained at 25 in 2000.

Geography

Climate
The climate in this area is characterized by hot, humid summers and generally mild to cool winters. According to the Köppen Climate Classification system, Sandy has a humid subtropical climate, abbreviated "Cfa" on climate maps.

Education
Sandy had three one-room school buildings, with all three coming together as one in 1925. It had two teachers employed. It then joined with the Johnson City Independent School District. It continues to be served by the Johnson City ISD today.

References

Unincorporated communities in Blanco County, Texas
Unincorporated communities in Texas